The Temporary Foreign Worker Program (TFWP) is a program of the Government of Canada that allows employers in Canada to hire foreign nationals. Workers brought in under the program are referred to as Temporary Foreign Workers (TFWs) and are allowed to work in positions that are not filled by Canadians. The aim was to address skill shortages and promote economic growth. Initially, the program was aimed at nurses and farm workers, but today it gives highly skilled and less skilled workers the opportunity to work in Canada.

History 
Between 1993 and 2013, the total number of TFW more than doubled to 338,189 workers; between 2006 and 2014 alone, over 500,000 workers were brought into Canada under the program. When TFWP began in 1973, most of the individuals brought in were high-skill workers, such as medical specialists. In 2002, however, a "low-skilled workers" category was added, which now makes up most of the temporary foreign workforce. In 2006, the program was expanded, introducing fast-tracking for some locations. It was revised again in 2013, raising wages, charging employer fees, and removing the accelerated applications.

In 2018, the number of workers allowed increased by 36 percent and more than 17,600 permits were issued.

During the Covid-pandemic in 2020, the Canadian government, together with the TFWP, sought out to increase protection for foreign workers through protective legislation.

Employment 
Apart from their temporary status, TFWs have the same employment rights as Canadian workers, and can phone a free 1-800 number for help. However, because of the way in which the Canadian residence of a temporary foreign worker is tied to an employer, some TFWs have said they have been treated worse than Canadian co-workers.

It is against Canadian federal rules to bring in temporary foreign workers if Canadian workers are available. For an employer to hire a TFW, or for a TFW to work in a company they started in Canada, they may need to obtain a Labour Market Impact Assessment (LMIA). A positive LMIA or a confirmation letter grants permission to the employer who proves that there is a need for a foreign worker to fill the job as no Canadian worker is available and that such hiring will not negatively impact the Canadian labour market.

Foreign agricultural workers make up roughly 60% of all workers coming into the country under the TFWP.

Controversies

2013
In April 2013, the Canadian Broadcasting Corporation (CBC) began reporting on issues surrounding the hiring of temporary foreign workers.

On 6 April, CBC News reported that Canadian IT workers at the Royal Bank of Canada (RBC) were losing their jobs to replacement foreign workers, who were brought from India by outsourcing firm iGATE. Existing RBC employees trained their replacements before they themselves were laid off, causing their appeal to the media. Additionally in 2013, CBC found that, in Saskatchewan, 65% of recent newly created jobs were held by temporary foreign workers, and in Nova Scotia over one thousand employers had requested foreign workers.

CBC also reported that a Chinese company that owns a mine in British Columbia was attempting to import workers from China. According to the Huffington Post, one of the requirements of the job was the ability to speak Mandarin Chinese.

In October, Huffington Post reported that the Alberta Federation of Labour said foreign workers were displacing Canadian workers in Fort McMurray. The report claimed that 270 Canadian workers employed by a Toronto-based firm were to be replaced by foreign workers employed by an Italian firm. On 23 October, Global News reported that Farmers of North America, in Saskatoon, was helping farmers recruit TFWs in order to help them. The Canadian Federation of Agriculture reportedly estimated that Canada was in need of 30,000 seasonal and longer-term farm workers. Employment Canada acknowledged that there was a shortage of agricultural workers.

Political reaction
The move resulted in a strong negative reaction from the public, and garnered attention from the office of the Minister of Human Resources and Skills Development Canada. Accordingly, Human Resources Minister Diane Finley issued a statement saying the situation is unacceptable if it is true. 

RBC responded to the controversy by issuing a statement denying the charges and offering clarification of the situation. While a reported 45 employees lost their jobs, the bank nevertheless had indicated that they intended to expand this practice in the coming year.

In May, the TFWP was the focus of debate between the Conservative government and the NDP Official Opposition, and Prime Minister Stephen Harper was questioned at the House of Commons about the program. CBC reported that some employers were said to be abusing the TFWP by bringing in temporary foreign workers to areas where qualified local workers were collecting Employment Insurance (EI) benefits. During Question Period, Harper said that the government had addressed this issue before 2013, and that changes had been made to both the EI and TFW programs in order to address these issues. He stated that the NDP did not cooperate at the time in the introduction of the changes, and that NDP Members of Parliament requested more foreign workers in their own ridings.

2014
In January 2014, Employment Minister Jason Kenney pledged a second round of reforms citing employee frustration. In April, issues with the program came under scrutiny by CBC relating to the procurement of temporary foreign unskilled labour by McDonald's Canada. On 24 April, Kenney announced that the TWFP had been suspended for the food-services industry. It has since been renewed.

Microsoft
In December 2014, CBC reported that Microsoft Canada obtained an exemption from the federal government that will allow the company to bring in an unspecified number of TFW to British Columbia. The trainee foreign workers—most of whom would be from India and China—were to be hired without requiring Microsoft to look for Canadian workers who could fill the positions.

2017 
In 2017, the Toronto Star conducted an investigation that revealed a large number of cases of incorrect accommodation, lack of access to medical care, violence and abuse.

See also
Guest worker program
Labour Market Impact Assessment
Live-In Caregiver Program
Seasonal Agricultural Worker Program
Temporary residency

References

External links
 Temporary Foreign Worker Program at the Government of Canada

Immigration to Canada
Labour in Canada
Political controversies in Canada
Foreign workers